The Institute of Bankers, Bangladesh (IBB) is a professional body of banks and financial institutions in Bangladesh. It is managed as an autonomous professional body under supervision of Bangladesh Bank.

History 
Institute of Bankers was registered on the 6 February 1973 as an association under the Societies Registration Act, 1660 (Act No. XXI of 1660). Before that some eminent bankers and other professionals decided, in a meeting held on 26 July 1972, to establish the institute as a professional body of banks and financial institutions in Bangladesh. The main objective of the body is to develop professionally qualified and competent bankers primarily through a process of training, examinations and professional development programs.

On 8 February 2023, Bangladesh Bank has issued a circular stating that passing banking diploma both parts (JAIBB & DAIBB) is mandatory from 1 January 2024 for all bankers to get promoted to any higher grade from senior officer except managing director. However, many bankers, finance professionals, economists and related personnel expressed mixed reactions to the new circular. Most stated that criteria mandatory diploma pass for getting promotion will rises discriminatory.

Functions 
IBB arranges two-tier banking diploma examination for the professionals in banking and financial sector in the country. Applicants have to appear in the Part-I examination, officially named as JAIBB (Junior Associate of the Institute of Bankers, Bangladesh) where every applicant have to pass six compulsory courses. The courses include: Accounting for Financial Services, Business Communication, Laws and Practice of Banking, Marketing of Financial Services, Organization & Management and Principles of Economics & Bangladesh Economy. After completing Part-I, applicants have to appear in the Part-II examination, officially named as DAIBB (Diplomaed Associate of the Institute of Bankers, Bangladesh) where every applicant have to pass five compulsory courses named Management of Financial Institutions, Lending Operation & Risk Management, International Trade & Foreign Exchange, Information Technology in Financial Services and Management Accounting and one optional course from six choices named Central Banking & Monetary Policy, Agriculture & Microfinance, SME & Consumer Banking, Islamic Banking, Investment Banking & Lease Financing and Treasury Management. After completing every part, every applicant is awarded with a certificate.

Governing body 
A council or parishad governs the institute. The president of the council is the governor of Bangladesh Bank. Besides, a general secretary is responsible for the overall management of the organization. Currently, Laila Bilkis Ara is serving as the secretary general of the institution. A secretary is also appointed for management of the institution.

Membership 
Generally, the representatives of banks and financial institutions working in Bangladesh are members of the institute. However, the council or parishad has the solo right to elect new member and remove existing members.

See also 
 Bangladesh Institute of Bank Management
 The Institute of Chartered Accountants of Bangladesh
 Bangladesh Association of Banks

References 

Banking in Bangladesh
1973 establishments in Bangladesh
Organisations based in Dhaka